Embrace the End were a metalcore band from Sacramento, California, formed in 1999. Originally consisting of only four members, the band went through several line-up changes, at one point having as many as six members, including two vocalists.  However, shortly after the departure of vocalist Pat Piccolo following the release of their major label debut in 2005, they decided to continue with only Jesse Alford on vocals. Throughout their history, they featured members of the bands First Blood, Killing the Dream, and Alcatraz. After a series of small independent releases with various line-ups, Counting Hallways to the Left was released on CD in summer 2005 on Abacus Records. Steady touring for band occurred in the years that followed across the United States, through the release of their second and final album Ley Lines in 2008.  The band has since been on indefinite hiatus, engaging in various independent musical projects.

Band members 
 Jesse Alford – vocals
 Christopher McMahon – Guitar
 Addison Quarles – Bass
 Bart Mullis – drums
 Spencer Daly – Guitar, vocals

Former members 
(from most recent to oldest)

 Daniel Borman – Bass
 Joel Adams – Guitar
 Pat Piccolo – Vocals
 Karl Metts – Guitar
 Louie Giovanni – Bass
 Kyle Dixon – Guitar
 Josh Akers – Vocals
 Ryan Hayes - Drums

Discography

Full lengths 
 It All Begins With One Broken Dream (2001) Dark Vision Records
 Counting Hallways to the Left (2005) Abacus Records
 Ley Lines (2008)  Century Media Records

Demos 
 S/T Demo Tape (2000)

Vinyl 
 S/T 7"  (2003) Mokita Records

Splits 
 Embrace The End vs. The End of Six Thousand Years (2006) Still Life Records

External links 
 Official Century Media Records site
 Myspace

Musical groups established in 2001
Heavy metal musical groups from California
Metalcore musical groups from California
Century Media Records artists
Musical groups from Sacramento, California
Abacus Recordings artists